2,3-Dimercapto-1-propanesulfonic acid (abbreviated DMPS) and its sodium salt (known as Unithiol) are chelating agents that form complexes with various heavy metals. They are related to dimercaprol, which is another chelating agent.

The synthesis of DMPS was first reported in 1956 by V. E. Petrunkin. The effects of DMPS on heavy metal poisoning, including with polonium-210, were investigated in the following years. DMPS was found to have some protective effect, prolonging the survival time.

A study was undertaken of DMPS use by workers involved in the production of a calomel skin bleaching lotion and in direct contact with mercurous chloride and that already showed elevated urine mercury levels. The sodium salt of DMPS was found to be effective in lowering the body burden of mercury and in decreasing the urinary mercury concentration to normal levels.

DMPS administrated to a mercury poisoned animal model failed to remove the mercury from tissues and reduce the inorganic mercury burden in the brain.

A 2008 study reported a case of Stevens–Johnson syndrome (SJS), a potentially serious disease, in a child undergoing chelation therapy with DMPS; the SJS resolved gradually after the chelation therapy was stopped.

A 2020 study found DMPS to provide some benefits taken orally in mitigating effects from hemotoxic snakebites (using venom from saw-scaled vipers Viperidae Echis) in mouse models when given soon after exposure, suggesting its potential for repurposing as a prehospital treatment. [Albulescu, L.; Hale, M.S.;Ainsworth, S.; Alsolaiss, J.; Crittenden, E.; Calvete, J.J.; Evans, C.; Wilkinson, M.C.; Harrison, R.A.; Kool, J.; Casewell, N.R. (2020). "Preclinical validation of a repurposed metal chelator as an early-intervention therapeutic for hemotoxic snakebite". Science Translational Medicine, Vol 12, Issue 542, 8314 DOI: 10.1126/scitranslmed.aay8314]

See also
 Chelation therapy
 Dimercaptosuccinic acid
 EDTA
 Heavy metal poisoning
 Mercury poisoning

References

Chelating agents
Sulfonic acids
Thiols
Antidotes